

Events

January
  January 1 – First phase of the Lusail Tram opens.
  January 8 – Hangzhou–Taizhou high-speed railway opens.
 January 11 – Trial opening of the Jinyi section of Jinhua Rail Transit's Jinyidong line.
  January 13 – Line 4 of the Paris Métro is extended from Mairie de Montrouge to Bagneux–Lucie Aubrac.
  January 15 – The Jiaxing Tram is extended from Fanggong Road Binhe Road to Jiaxing Railway Station.
  January 25 – The first phase of Line 9 of the Chongqing Rail Transit opens between Gaotanyan and Xingke Avenue.

February
  February 16 – Opening of Line 2 extension of the Rabat–Salé tramway.
  February 21 – The first phases of Lines 3 and 10 of the Hangzhou Metro open, and Line 4 is extended from Pengbu to Chihua Street.

March
  March 6 – The Pune Metro starts operations between PCMC Bhavan and Phugewadi on the Purple Line, and between Vanaz and Garware College on the Aqua Line.
 March 19
  – Line 4 of the Seoul Metropolitan Subway is extended from Danggogae to Jinjeop.
  – The 75 kilometer 'Beno' rail line between Belgrade and Novi Sad in Serbia is reopened as a high speed line as part of the Budapest–Belgrade railway.
  March 21 – The Union Square Branch of the MBTA subway's Green Line Extension opens in Somerville.
  March 22 – Manila MRT Line 3 completes an upgrading and rehabilitation project.
 March 25
  – Construction of the Moscow–Saint Petersburg high-speed railway is suspended.
  – The Bilbao tram is extended from Atxuri to Bolueta using the former Euskotren Trena alignment between Kukullaga and Atxuri.
  March 28 – Allegro international high-speed service ends operations.
  March 29 – Punjabi Bagh West station on the Delhi Metro becomes an interchange between the Pink Line and the Green Line.
  March 30 – Guiyang railway loop line opens.
 March 31
  – The first phase of Line 22 of the Guangzhou Metro opens from Panyu Square to Chentougang.
  – The Krasnodar tramway is extended from Solnechnaya to Ulitsa Petra Metalnikova.

April
 April 1
  – Line 7 of the Hangzhou Metro is extended from Citizen Center to Wushan Square, and Line 9 is extended from Coach Center to Guanyintang.
  – ScotRail takes over from Abellio ScotRail as operator of last resort of the ScotRail franchise.
  April 2 – The first phases of Lines 2 and 7 of the Mumbai Metro open.
  April 9 – Line 5 of the Prague tram network is extended from Sídliště Barrandov to Holyně.
  April 23 – Line 10 of the Poznań tram network is extended from Lechicka/Naramowicka to Błażeja.
  April 25 – Line 2 of the Darmstadt tram network is extended from Hochschulstadion to TU-Lichtwiese.
 April 29
  – Line 1 of the Shaoxing Metro is extended from China Textile City to Fangquan.
  – Line 5 of the Fuzhou Metro opens.

May
 May 1
  – Line 7 of the Guangzhou Metro is extended from Guangzhou South Railway Station to Meidi Dadao.
  – Opening of the first phase of the Fenghuang Maglev.
 May 6 –  The MTR retires Metro-Cammell EMUs after 40 years of service.
  May 15 – The MTR East Rail line is extended across Victoria Harbour to Hong Kong Island.
 May 17 – Line 10 of Metrovalencia opens.
 May 20 – The Tempe Streetcar opens in Tempe, Arizona.
 May 24 – The central section of Crossrail opens, and Crossrail and TfL Rail are officially branded the "Elizabeth line".
May 28
 – The Odense Letbane opens.
 – The Shinbundang Line of the Seoul Metropolitan Subway is extended from Gangnam to Sinsa, and the Sillim Line opens.
  May 30 – Line 1 of the Almaty Metro is extended from Moskva to Bauyrzhan Momyshuly.
  May 31 – Line 12 of the Paris Metro is extended from Front Populaire to Mairie d'Aubervilliers.

June
  June 3 – Garmisch-Partenkirchen train derailment: A double-decker Regionalbahn passenger train derails near Burgrain in Bavaria, killing four people and injuring many more.
  June 10 – Line 3 of the Hangzhou Metro is extended from Chaowang Road to West Wenyi Road, and the branch from South Xixi Wetland to Shima opens.
  June 12 – The Gawler railway line reopens after an 18-month closure due to the electrification of the line.
 June 16
  – Opening of the Hotan–Ruoqiang railway, completing a 2,712-km loop line around the Taklamakan Desert.
  – Partial opening of MRT Putrajaya line, Malaysia's fifth metro line, from Sungai Buloh/Kwasa Damansara to Kampong Batu.
  June 18 – Line 4 of the Chongqing Rail Transit is extended from Tangjiatuo to Huangling.
  June 20 – The Chengjiao line of the Zhengzhou Metro is extended from Xinzheng International Airport to Zhengzhou Hangkonggang Railway Station.
  June 24 – Line 10 of the Hangzhou Metro is extended from Cuibai Road to Xueyuan Road.
  June 25 – The Jiaxing Tram is extended from Jiaxing Railway Station to East Zhongshan Road/Anle Road.
  June 26 – Reopening of the PNR South Main Line stretch from San Pablo to Lucena after a period of suspension starting October 2013, as part of the PNR South Long Haul.
  June 28 – Line 6 of the Changsha Metro opens.
  June 29 – Line 5 of the Kunming Metro opens.
  June 30 – Line M2 of the Warsaw Metro is extended west from Księcia Janusza to Bemowo.

July 
  July 1 – Connection between Madrid Atocha and Madrid Chamartín opens.
  July 2 – Line T2 of the Bursa tramway opens.
  July 3 – Opening of the initial route of the Cairo Light Rail Transit.
  July 6 – Île-de-France tramway Line 13 opens.
  July 14 – Line 2 of the Kolkata Metro is extended from Phoolbagan to Sealdah.
  July 17 – Line 1 of the West Midlands Metro is extended from Birmingham Library to Edgbaston.
  July 18 – London Overground extension to Barking Riverside opens.
  July 22 – Opening of the initial section of the Dali–Ruili railway.
  July 29 – Amtrak extends the Ethan Allen Express to Union Station in Burlington, Vermont.
  July 30 – Four infill stations open on Line 19 of the Beijing Subway.

August 
  August 6 – The Chongqing Rail Transit Jiangtiao line opens between Tiaodeng and Shengquansi.
  August 21 – The SEPTA Regional Rail Media/Elwyn Line is extended from Elwyn to Wawa, and the line is renamed the Media/Wawa Line.
  August 28 – Line 6 of the Fuzhou Metro opens.
 August 29
  – Line T3 of the Caen tramway is extended from Collège Hawking to Fleury-sur-Orne.
  – Opening of the section between Łagiewniki and Kurdwanów on the Kraków tramway.
  August 30 – Full opening of the Jinyi section of Jinhua Rail Transit's Jinyidong line.
  August 31 – Opening of the Yekaterinburg interurban tram Route 333, connecting Yekaterinburg to Verkhnyaya Pyshma.

September 
  September 1 – The Kochi Metro is extended from Pettah to SN Junction.
  September 6 – Opening of the initial section of the Changde–Yiyang–Changsha high-speed railway.
  September 11 – Line T1 of the Luxembourg tramway is extended to Lycée Bonnevoie.
  September 12 – RATP introduces automated trains on Line 4 of the Paris Metro.
  September 13 – Opening of the Red Line and the first phase of the Green Line of Mi Tren in Cochabamba.
  September 20 – Line B of the Rennes Metro opens.
 September 22
  – Hangzhou Metro Line 3 is extended from West Wenyi Road to Wushanqiancun, Line 10 is extended from Xueyuan Road to Huanglong Sports Center, and Line 19 opens. 
  – Opening of the final section (Huzhou–Hangzhou) of the Shangqiu–Hangzhou high-speed railway.
  September 23 – Opening of the initial section of the Nishi Kyushu Shinkansen.
  September 24 –  Line 1 Yonge–University of the Toronto subway introduces automatic train control across the full length of the line.
  September 28 – Line M2 of the Warsaw Metro is extended east from Trocka to Bródno.
 September 30
  – Line S8 of the Nanjing Metro is extended south from Taishanxincun to Changjiangdaqiaobei.
  – Line 2 of the Dalian Metro is extended from Xinzhaizi to Dalian North railway station.
  – Line 6 of the Zhengzhou Metro opens from Jiayu to Changzhuang.

October 
  October 2
  – The East-West Corridor of the Ahmedabad Metro begins service.
  – Line M4 of the Istanbul Metro is extended from Tavşantepe to Sabiha Gökçen Airport.
  October 3 – The Long Island Rail Road's Third Track Project between Floral Park and Hicksville is completed.
  October 5 – The Kaohsiung Metro's Circular light rail is extended from TRA Museum of Fine Arts to Heart of Love River.
 October 6
  – Opening of Phase 3-1 of Cairo Metro Line 3, linking Attaba to Kit-Kat.
  – The North-South Corridor of the Ahmedabad Metro begins service.
  October 7 – The northern portion of the Los Angeles Metro Rail's K Line opens after several delays.
  October 9 – Transperth's Airport line opens between High Wycombe and Claremont.
 October 10
  – Line 3 of the Athens Metro is extended from Nikaia to Dimotiko Theatro.
  – The Metro Express is extended from Phoenix to Curepipe Central.
  October 17 – Line 9 of the Helsinki tram network is extended from Pasila to Ilmalantori.
  October 24  – Arrow begins service in Redlands, California.
  October 26 – Cádiz Bay tram-train begun operation.
 October 28
  – Shenzhen Metro Line 11 is extended from Futian to Gangxia North and Line 14 opens.
  – Line F4 of the Istanbul Metro network opens.
  October 29 – The Trans-Sulawesi Railway opens between Barru and Pangkep on a limited basis.

November 
  November 1 – The Olomouc tramway is extended from Trnkova to U Kapličky.
  November 5 – Gaziantep's Gaziray starts operation.
  November 6 –  Elizabeth line direct service commenced between Paddington and Shenfield and between Reading and Heathrow to Abbey Wood.
  November 10 – Opening of Line 1 of the Nantong Rail Transit.
  November 13 – Opening of Stage 3 of the MRT Thomson–East Coast line.
  November 15 – The Washington Metro Silver Line is extended to Ashburn via Dulles International Airport.
  November 18 – Line 10 of the Tianjin Metro opens.
  November 19 – Central Subway in San Francisco opens after repeated delays.
  November 21 – Opening of the Bergen Light Rail Line 2 between Byparken and Fyllingsdalen.
  November 26 – The first section of Milan Metro Line 4 opens between Dateo and Linate Aeroporto.
  November 28 – Lines 6B and 12 of the Shenzhen Metro open.
  November 29 – Nanhai Tram Line 1 extends from Sanshanxinchengbei to Linyuedong.

December 
  December 1 – Line 2 of the Ningbo Rail Transit extends from Congyuan Road to Honglian.
  December 3 – Line M1 of the Helsinki Metro extends from Matinkylä to Kivenlahti.
  December 9 – Opening of Wendlingen–Ulm high-speed railway.
 December 11
  – Opening of the Osová-Nemocnice Bohunice tram line in Brno.
  – The Aqua Line of the Nagpur Metro is extended from Sitabuldi to Prajapati Nagar, while the Orange Line is extended from Kasturchand Park to Automative Square.
  – The Follo Line opened after delays.
  – Opening of the Limmatalerbahn, a LRT line connecting the Limmatvalley with Zurich as Line 20 in the network.
  December 12 – Opening of the Medford Branch of the Green Line Extension to Somerville and Medford, Massachusetts.
  December 19 – The Silesian Interurbans is extended from Zagórze BMC (formerly named Zagórze Petla) to Zagórze Rondo Jana Pawla II.
  December 20 – The PHX Sky Train is extended from Terminal 3 to Rental Car Center.
  December 21 – Brightline opens new infill stations at Aventura and Boca Raton.
  December 23 – The Purple Line of the Baku Metro is extended from Avtovağzal to Xocəsən.
 December 26
  – Line 5 of the Hefei Metro is extended from Wanghuchengxi to Jiqiao Road.
  – Opening of Line 4 of the Qingdao Metro.
 December 28
  – The first phase of the Dhaka Metro from Utara to Agargaon opened.
  – Opening of Line S1 of the Taizhou Rail Transit.
  – Opening of the Yidong section of the Jinyidong line of the Jinhua Rail Transit.
  – Opening of the Huangshi Modern Tram.
  – Opening of Line 1 of the Pingshan SkyShuttle.
  – Opening of Line 16 of the Shenzhen Metro.
  – Line 1 of the Nanjing Metro is extended from Baguazhoudaqiaonan to Maigaoqiao, while Line 7 begins operation.
  – Opening of Line 3 of the Foshan Metro.
  December 29 – Line 6 of the Xi'an Metro is extended from Xibeigongyedaxue to Fangzhicheng.
 December 30
  – Line 7 of the Wuhan Metro is extended from Garden Expo North to Hengdian, Line 16 is extended from Zhoujiahe to Hannan General Airport.
  – Opening of Line 3 of the Kolkata Metro.

Industry awards

North America
 Awards presented by Railway Age magazine
 2022 Railroader of the Year: Keith Creel (CP) and Patrick J. Ottensmeyer (KCS)

References